Andries Botha may refer to:
 Andries Botha (politician)
 Andries Botha (artist)